The Estonian-language surname Käspermay refer to:

Kalle Käsper, Estonian writer
Gohar Markosjan-Käsper, Armenian writer who lived in Estonia
Veljo Käsper, Estonian screenwriter and film director

See also
Casper
Kasper (surname)

Estonian-language surnames